Sabra is both a given name and surname. Notable people with the name include:

Given name 
 Sabrah ibn Ma'bad (fl. c. 600 CE), Arabian religious leader
 Sabra Loomis (born 1938), Irish-American poet
Sabra Moore (born 1943), American artist
 Sabra Johnson (born 1987), American dancer
 Sabra Wilbur Vought (1877–1942), American librarian
 Sabra Williams (born c. 1970), British actor

Surname 
 A. I. Sabra (1924–2013), Egyptian historian of science
 Abba Sabra (fl. c. 1450), Ethiopian religious leader
 Adam Sabra (born 1968), American professor of Islamic studies
 George Sabra (born 1947), Syrian politician
 Khalilah Sabra (born 1967), American author and activist
 Maher Sabra (born 1992), Lebanese footballer
 Wadia Sabra (1876–1952), Lebanese composer

See also 
 Sabra (disambiguation)